Carmer is a surname. Notable people with the surname include:

Adam Carmer (born 1966), American writer and inventor
Carl Carmer (1893–1976), American writer
Johann Heinrich von Carmer (1720–1801), Prussian judicial reformer
Sherlock Houston Carmer (1842–1884), American politician

See also
Carmer Octagon House, also known as the Armour–Stiner House, is a unique octagon-shaped and domed Victorian style house located at 45 West Clinton Avenue in Irvington, in Westchester County, New York
Mount Carmer, is a mountain on the east side of Wotkyns Glacier (Antarctica)

References